Ghazal is a 1975 Iranian film directed by Masoud Kimiai. It stars Mohammad Ali Fardin, Faramarz Gharibian and Pouri Banayi. It is based on the short story "The Interloper", written by Jorge Luis Borges. Since Fardin had been typecast as a happy-go-lucky person who always appeared in movies with happy endings, this film was a departure for him and was not successful at the box office.

Plot
Hojjat and Zeinolabedin are two brothers who make a living by forestry. They have a steady life until Hojjat brings a prostitute from the city to the jungles. She keeps the house and washes and does the house chores and also has sex with each of the brothers. The two brothers fall in love with her and can not put up with the situation. They kill the girl, set fire to their house and leave the jungle.

Cast
Mohammad Ali Fardin as Hojjat
Faramarz Gharibian as Zeinolabedin
Pouri Banayi as Ghazal
Amrollah Saberi as Nosrat
Saeed Pirdust as the man at the bar
Parvin Soleimani
Shahnaz
Anita

References

External links
Ghazal in Internet Movie Database
Ghazal on "The Garden of Forking Paths" Borges site.

Iranian drama films
1975 films
Films directed by Masoud Kimiai
1970s Persian-language films